"Love Will Wait" is the debut single by Lisa Stansfield's band, Blue Zone, released in the United Kingdom in March 1986. It was written by Stansfield, Ian Devaney and Andy Morris, and produced by Blue Zone. The single included two bonus tracks, "There Was I" and "Dirty Talk" (both written and produced by Blue Zone) which were later included on Stansfield's 2003 album, The Complete Collection. "There Was I" was also featured on the single "Jackie" in 1988. "Love Will Wait" was remixed by Julian Mendelsohn (Re-Mix) and Chris Porter (Extended Version).

Track listings
UK 7" single
"Love Will Wait" – 4:20 
"There Was I" – 4:28

UK 12" single
"Love Will Wait" (Extended Version) – 6:46
"There Was I" – 4:28

UK 12" single (Re-Mix)
"Love Will Wait" (Re-Mix) – 6:20
"Dirty Talk" – 4:40
"There Was I" – 4:28

References

1986 songs
1986 debut singles
Blue Zone (band) songs
Songs written by Lisa Stansfield
Arista Records singles
Songs written by Ian Devaney
Songs written by Andy Morris (musician)